Margaux Okou-Zouzouo (born February 18, 1991 in Biarritz, France) is a French basketball player who plays for club Aix en provence of the League feminine de basket the top league of basketball for women in France.

References

French women's basketball players
1991 births
Sportspeople from Biarritz
Living people